Imma aritogiton is a moth in the family Immidae. It was described by Alexey Diakonoff in 1955. It is found in New Guinea.

References

Moths described in 1955
Immidae
Moths of New Guinea